A. George Milligan (born 1891, deceased) was a Scottish professional footballer who played as an inside forward.

References

1891 births
Year of death unknown
Footballers from Glasgow
Scottish footballers
Association football forwards
Burnley F.C. players
Clyde F.C. players
Crystal Palace F.C. players
English Football League players